ViaMobilidade is a company in Brazil belonging to Companhia de Concessões Rodoviárias, being responsible for the operation, maintenance and investments in Line 5–Lilac, Line 8–Diamond and Line 9–Emerald of São Paulo Metropolitan Trains for 20 years, through a public-private concession contract, in partnership with the Government of the State of São Paulo.

Besides CCR, the consortium also has RuasInvest as investor, branch of one of the most traditional bus groups of São Paulo. Both companies also manage the Line 4–Yellow of ViaQuatro. Besides that, the consortium will operate Line 17–Gold, currently under construction, and will connect stations Morumbi of ViaMobilidade Line Line 9–Emerald, in Marginal Pinheiros, to Congonhas Airport, in Southside São Paulo, and will also operate Line 15–Silver.

On 20 April 2021, the company won an auction in the B3 headquarters and operates the former CPTM lines 8–Diamond and 9–Emerald for 30 years.

Lines

Operational Extensions

Future developments

ViaMobilidade fleet
Line 5–Lilac has a fleet of 34 vehicles:

See also
 Line 5 (São Paulo Metro)
 Line 15 (São Paulo Metro)
 Line 17 (São Paulo Metro)
 CCR S.A.

References

External links
 ViaMobilidade official website

Rapid transit in Brazil
Electric railways in Brazil
Underground rapid transit in Brazil
ViaMobilidade